The coat of arms of Quebec was adopted by order-in-council of the Government of Quebec on 9 December 1939, replacing the arms assigned by royal warrant of Queen Victoria on 26 May 1868.

Symbolism 
The shield is divided into three horizontal fields:
 Top — three gold fleurs-de-lis on a blue background, symbolizing royal France;
 Middle — a gold lion passant guardant on a red background, symbolizing the Kingdom of England;
 Bottom — three green maple leaves on a gold background, symbolizing Canada.

The shield is surmounted by the Tudor Crown and accompanied by a silver scroll bearing the province's motto, .

Blazon
The blazon is:

Tierced (divided in three parts, horizontally) in fess, Azure three fleurs-de-lis Or, Gules a lion passant guardant, and Or a sprig of three maple leaves Vert; Motto: JE ME SOUVIENS.

History

Arms were first granted to the province in 1868 by Queen Victoria. They were blazoned as follows:

Or on a Fess Gules between two Fleurs de Lis in chief Azure, and a sprig of three Leaves of Maple slipped Vert in base, a Lion passant guardant Or.

However, in 1939, the Quebec government adopted arms by order-in-council, replacing the two blue fleurs-de-lis on the golden field with the royal arms of France Modern in chief. Quebec is the only Canadian province to have adopted arms by its own authority.

The federal government is inconsistent in the use of the two variants: it often uses the 1939 variant, but in some cases, such as on the Centennial Flame on Parliament Hill and the badge of the Royal 22e Régiment, it uses the 1868 variant.

Notes

References
 Gouvernement du Québec. "Les armoiries du Québec", in the site Drapeau et symboles nationaux of the Government of Quebec, updated on 14 January 2008
 Luc Bouvier. "Les armoiries du Québec d’hier à aujourd’hui", in L'Action nationale, February 1999.
 Gaston Deschênes (1990). Les symboles d'identité québécoise, Québec: Publications du Québec, 39 pages

External links
 
 Ministère de la Justice – Armoiries du Québec 

Quebec
Provincial symbols of Quebec
Coats of arms with fleurs de lis
Coats of arms with lions
Coats of arms with crowns